Skinner is a surname. Notable people with the surname include:

Etymology
The surname Skinner is an occupational surname of English origin, from the Old Norse word 'skinn', denoting someone who stripped the hide from animals, to be used in the production of fur clothing or leather.

Politics and law
Alanson Skinner (1794–1876), New York politician
Alonzo A. Skinner (1814–1877), United States judge
Avery Skinner (1796–1876), New York politician
Carlton Skinner (1913–2004), Governor of Guam
Cortlandt Skinner (1727–1799), Loyalist officer during the American Revolutionary War.
Dennis Skinner (born 1932), British MP for Bolsover
Ed Skinner (1936–2015), American politician
Harry Skinner (politician) (1855–1929), US Representative from North Carolina
James John Skinner (1923–2008), Irish-born Zambian politician and jurist
Jerry Skinner (1900–1962), New Zealand MP
Jillian Skinner (born 1944), Australian politician
Leo Skinner (1901–1970), Irish Fianna Fáil politician
Mark Skinner (1813–1887), US Attorney for Illinois
Nancy Skinner (California politician) (born 1954), Democratic member  of the California State Senate
Nancy Skinner (commentator), a radio and television commentator based in Michigan
Onias C. Skinner (1817–1878), Illinois jurist and lawyer
Peter Skinner (born 1959), MEP for South East England
Richard Skinner (American politician) (1778–1833), American politician, attorney, and jurist from Vermont
Roger Skinner (1773–1825), New York judge
Samuel K. Skinner (born 1938), White House Chief of Staff during the presidency of George H. W. Bush
Thomas Gregory Skinner (1842–1907), US Representative from North Carolina
Thomson J. Skinner (1752–1809), US Representative from Massachusetts
Tom Skinner (1909–1991), New Zealand trade unionist
William I. Skinner (1812–1891), New York politician

Writers
Charles Montgomery Skinner (1852–1907), American writer
Constance Lindsay Skinner (1877–1939), Canadian writer, historian
Quentin Skinner (born 1940), Regius Professor of Modern History at Cambridge University and author

Media and arts
Claire Skinner (born 1965), English actress
Colin Skinner (born 1985), British magician
Cornelia Otis Skinner (1899–1979), American author and actress
Emily Skinner (born 1970), American stage actress
Emily Skinner (born 2002), American actress
Fannie Lovering Skinner (1856-1938), American composer
Frank Skinner (born 1957), English comedian
Frank Skinner (composer) (1897–1968) - an American composer
Grahame Skinner - Scottish musician vocalist with band "Skinner" and ex-Hipsway
James Scott Skinner (1843–1927), Scottish fiddler
Jane Skinner, Fox News daytime news anchor
Janet Lynn Skinner, (born 1955), American gospel musician
John Skinner (poet) (1721–1807), Scottish historian and songwriter
Katch Skinner, British artist
Leonard Skinner (1933–2010), American schoolteacher most famous as the namesake of the band Lynyrd Skynyrd
Mike Skinner (born 1978), British rapper who performs under the alias of The Streets
Penelope Skinner (born 1971), British playwright & screenwriter
Richard Skinner (broadcaster) (born 1951), British radio broadcaster
Zena Skinner (1927–2018), British cookery expert on television and radio
Robin Daniel Skinner (born 1998), Singer, songwriter, musician, and YouTuber who performs under the alias of Cavetown

Sports
Steve Keirn (born 1951), a retired professional wrestler best known as "Skinner"
Al Skinner (born 1952), an American men's college basketball head coach and a former collegiate and professional basketball player
Albert Skinner (1868-?), an English footballer
Avery Skinner (born 1999), American professional volleyball player
Bernard Skinner (sailor) (born 1930), Canadian olympian
Bob Skinner (born 1931), retired American professional baseball player
Brett Skinner (born 1983), Canadian ice hockey player
Brian Skinner (born 1976), American professional basketball player
Callum Skinner (born 1992), Scottish track cyclist
Craig Skinner (born 1969), American volleyball coach
Deontae Skinner (born 1990), American football player
Edward Arthur Skinner, (1847–1919) English cricketer
Jeff Skinner (born 1992), Canadian ice hockey player
Jimmy Skinner (1917–2007), former head coach of the NHL's Detroit Red Wings
JL Skinner (born 2001), American football player
Joel Skinner (born 1961), former baseball player
Jonty Skinner, South African Olympian and American swimming coach
Mike Skinner (NASCAR) (born 1957), NASCAR driver
Mykayla Skinner (born 1996), American artistic gymnast
Roy Skinner (1930–2010), American basketball coach who helped integrate the NCAA's Southeastern Conference
Sam Skinner (footballer) (born 1997), Australian rules footballer
Sonny Skinner (born 1960), American professional golfer
Stuart Skinner (born 1998), Canadian ice hockey goaltender
Talvin Skinner (born 1943), an American former professional basketball player
Todd Skinner (1958–2006), rock climber
Wilfred Skinner (1934–2003), Singapore international player in association football and field hockey.
Zephaniah Skinner (born 1989), Australian rules footballer

Others
Andrew C. Skinner (born 1951)
Bernard Skinner (entomologist) (died 2017), English lepidopterist
B. F. Skinner (1904–1990), American behaviorist, psychologist and author
Clarence Skinner (minister) (1881–1949), Universalist minister
Edith Skinner (1902–1981), vocal coach
Edward Skinner, (1869-1910) British architect
Ernest M. Skinner (1866–1960), pipe organ craftsman
Eugene Skinner (1809–1864), founder of the town of Eugene, Oregon
Francis Skinner (1912–1941), friend of Ludwig Wittgenstein
George Herbert Skinner (1872–1931), British carburetter manufacturer
Harrie Skinner (1854–1936), founder of the Royal Automobile Club of Australia (RACA)
Herbert Wakefield Banks Skinner (1900–1960), British physicist
John Kendrick Skinner (1883–1918), a Scottish recipient of the Victoria Cross
John O. Skinner (1845–1932), an American physician, recipient of the Medal of Honor
Leslie Skinner (1900-1978), American scientist and military officer
Wickham Skinner, American educator

Disambiguation pages
Charles Skinner (disambiguation)
Clarence Skinner (disambiguation)
Craig Skinner (disambiguation)
David Skinner (disambiguation)
Edward Skinner (disambiguation)
Frank Skinner (disambiguation)
Harry Skinner (disambiguation)
Henry Skinner (disambiguation)
James Skinner (disambiguation)
Michael Skinner (disambiguation)
Stephen Skinner (disambiguation)
Thomas Skinner (disambiguation)
Will Skinner (disambiguation)

Fictional characters
Agnes Skinner, mother of Seymour Skinner in The Simpsons
Rodney Skinner, the Invisible Man in the film The League of Extraordinary Gentlemen
Seymour Skinner (Principal Skinner), Springfield elementary school principal in The Simpsons
Walter Skinner, from The X-Files
Chef Skinner, the main villain of the 2007 film Ratatouille
Skinner (comics), a Marvel Comics demon
Skinner (Neighbours), on the Australian soap opera Neighbours from 1988 to 1999
 Mr Skinner, henchmen from 101 Dalmatians (1996 film)
 Simon Skinner, Manager of Sandford's supermarket in Hot Fuzz (2007 film)

English-language surnames
Occupational surnames
English-language occupational surnames